General Purpose Uniform (GPU) is the working uniform of the Royal Australian Air Force.

GPU is notable and controversial for its inclusion of relatively bright, high-visibility shades of blue. As such it cannot serve as tactical battledress,  even though the pattern resembles the original Multicam camouflage from Crye Precision. Hence, RAAF commanders have been criticised and queried regarding GPU's lack of functional versatility, across musterings, and a key rationale for the new  uniform – the claim that its introduction will be cost neutral.

The blue and grey uniform was officially launched in 2014 by Chief of Air Force, Air Marshal Geoff Brown to give air force personnel a unique and easily identifiable appearance.

The GPU is to replace the Disruptive Pattern Camouflage Uniform (DPCU), also worn by the Australian Army, for general base duties and in non-warlike environments such as humanitarian tasks and Defence assistance to the civil community.

Existing Air Force DPCU production will be reduced and replaced by production of the GPU. It is planned that all Air Force personnel will be issued with a mix of camouflage uniforms and GPUs by the end of 2015.

The GPU is a Crye Precision Australian Multicam pattern utilising blue and grey colours selected to reflect Air Force colours. The colours can be found in the Royal Australian Air Force's Service Dress uniform, the RAAF Ensign, and from airframes and airfields. The uniform whilst consisting of a disruptive pattern, is not intended to be used as camouflage in warlike operations or environments.

References

Australian military uniforms
Camouflage patterns
Post–Cold War military equipment of Australia
Military camouflage